Ad Astral Aviation was a charter airline and  former advanced flight school based at Perth Airport, Western Australia since 1986. The company's name originated from the Latin phrase and common Air Force term 'ad astra' which means "to the stars".

Operations 
Ad Astral operated from the Perth Flight Centre in the general aviation precinct at Perth Airport. The charter airline branch of the company operated across Western Australia on mining contract flights as well as some occasional interstate ad hoc charters.

In late 2016, Ad Astral was acquired by Adelaide based charter airline Rossair in a deal to help both companies capture more of the growing tourism market in both South Australia and Western Australia.

Fleet 
Current fleet:
 Beechcraft 1900C – 2
 Beechcraft 1900D – 2
 Beechcraft 76 Duchess – 1

See also
 List of defunct airlines of Australia
 Aviation in Australia

References

External links

 Ad Astral

Airlines established in 1986
Australian companies established in 1986
Airlines of Western Australia
Companies based in Perth, Western Australia
Defunct airlines of Australia